Camperdown may refer to:

Places

Australia
 Camperdown, New South Wales, a suburb of Sydney
 Camperdown, Victoria, a town in Western Victoria

Canada
 Camperdown Signal Station, operated 1797–1925, located on Portuguese Cove, Nova Scotia

England
 Camperdown, Tyne and Wear, a village in the Metropolitan Borough of North Tyneside

Netherlands
 Kamperduin, a village in the province of North Holland, on the North Sea coast

Scotland
 Camperdown, Dundee, a suburb of Dundee

South Africa
 Camperdown, KwaZulu-Natal, a town

Other uses
 Battle of Camperdown, a naval battle fought between the Dutch and British fleets in 1797 off the Dutch coast near Kamperduin
 HMS Camperdown, four ships of the Royal Navy named after the battle
 Camperdown Elm (or "Weeping Elm"), a type of tree

See also 
 The Ballad of the "Clampherdown", a satirical poem by Rudyard Kipling about a naval battle